Josef Haist (31 December 1894 – 21 January 1950) was an Austrian footballer. He played in five matches for the Austria national football team from 1914 to 1917.

References

1894 births
1950 deaths
Austrian footballers
Austria international footballers
Place of birth missing
Association footballers not categorized by position
Austrian football managers
Austrian expatriate football managers
Expatriate football managers in Switzerland
FC Basel managers